Hangar One or Hangar 1 may refer to:

Hangar One (Mountain View, California) at Moffett Federal Airfield, California
Hangar One (Los Angeles, California) at Los Angeles International Airport (LAX)
Hangar 1 Vodka, a vodka made in Alameda, California
Hangar No. 1, Lakehurst Naval Air Station, at US Naval Air Station Lakehurst, site of Hindenburg disaster
Hangar 1: The UFO Files, television series

See also

 Hangar (disambiguation)